Elhadj Dabo (born 20 November 1995) is a Senegalese professional footballer who plays for French club Créteil as a midfielder.

Club career
On 20 July 2021, he joined French third-tier club Créteil.

International career
Dabo is a former youth international for Senegal.

References

External links

 
 

1994 births
Living people
Sportspeople from Thiès
Association football midfielders
Senegalese footballers
CS Sedan Ardennes players
Valenciennes FC players
US Créteil-Lusitanos players
Ligue 2 players
Championnat National players
Championnat National 2 players
Championnat National 3 players
Senegalese expatriate footballers
Expatriate footballers in France
Senegalese expatriate sportspeople in France